Marestaing is a commune in the Gers department in southwestern France.

Geography

Marestaing is surrounded by other divisions such as Monferran-Slaves, Lisle-Jourdain, Aurade, Endoufielle, Castillon-Slaves, and Fregouville.

Population

See also
Communes of the Gers department

References

Communes of Gers